Yeləkəsən (also, Yelekesan) is a village in the Shabran District of Azerbaijan.  The village forms part of the municipality of Xəlfələr.

References 

Populated places in Shabran District